

List of songs

Arcade version
There are 26 new songs in this game. Three of which are only playable on STEP BATTLE mode. All songs from the previous version returned in this game.

Home Version
The home version has all new songs from the original arcade and Link Version, three Console Konami Original, and three carryovers from previous version. The STEP BATTLE songs are now given full set of stepcharts that would be added on the arcade version of Dance Dance Revolution 3rdMix. In addition, it has two preview songs for the next mix that only playable on Basic difficulty.   With the exception of STRICTLY BUSINESS of Dance Dance Revolution was removed of Sega's Dreamcast console version.

New songs

AM-3P
"AM-3P" is a song by Ktz.

Bad Girls
"Bad Girls" is a song by Juliet Roberts.

Boom Boom Dollar
"Boom Boom Dollar" is a song by King Kong & D. Jungle Girls.

Brilliant 2U
"Brilliant 2U" is a song by Naoki.

Brilliant 2U (Orchestra-Groove)
"Brilliant 2U (Orchestra-Groove)" is a remix of Brilliant 2U by Naoki.

Dub I Dub
"Dub I Dub" is a song by Me & My.

Get Up'n Move
"Get Up'n Move" is a song by S & K.

Hero
"Hero" is a song by Papaya.

I Believe In Miracles
"I Believe In Miracles" is a song by Hi-Rise.

If You Were Here
"If You Were Here" is a song by Jennifer.

Make It Better So-Real Mix
"Make It Better So-Real Mix" is a remix of Make It Better by Mitsu-O! Summer.

Paranoia Max ~Dirty Mix~
"Paranoia Max ~Dirty Mix~" is a song by 190.

Put Your Faith In Me
"Put Your Faith In Me" is a song by Uzi-Lay.

Put Your Faith In Me (Jazzy Groove)
"Put Your Faith In Me (Jazzy Groove)" is a jazz arrangement of Put Your Faith In Me by Uzi-Lay.

Smoke
"Smoke" is a song by Mr.Ed Jumps the Gun. A cover of Smoke on the Water by Deep Purple.

SP-Trip Machine ~Jungle Mix~
"SP-Trip Machine ~Jungle Mix~" is a song by De-Sire.

Stomp To My beat
"Stomp To My beat" is a song by JS16.

Tubthumping
"Tubthumping" is a song by Chumbawamba.

See also
List of Dance Dance Revolution songs

References

External links

Dance Dance Revolution